Nethersole is a surname. Notable people with the surname include:

Sir Francis Nethersole,  (1587–1659) Secretary to the Electress Elizabeth, prisoner in the Tower of London, Member of Parliament for Corfe Castle, Dorset, and political pamphleteer of the English Civil War.
Lieutenant-Colonel F. R. Nethersole CIE, (1865 - 1933) Indian Army officer, administrator in Burma.
Noel Newton "Crab" Nethersole, (1903 – 1959) Jamaican Rhodes Scholar, cricket player and administrator, lawyer, politician, economist, and Jamaica's Minister for Finance.
Olga Nethersole CBE RRC, (1867 - 1951) English actress, theatre producer, and wartime nurse/health educator.
Robert Nethersole, (1482-?1556) Member of the English Parliament for Dover.

Surnames of English origin